The China State Construction Engineering Corporation (CSCEC) is the largest construction company in the world by revenue and the 8th largest general contractor in terms of overseas sales, as of 2020.

While most of the assets of CSCEC were floated in the stock exchange as China State Construction Engineering Corporation Limited (CSCECL), CSCEC retained some assets such as schools and hospitals, as well as the stake in China Construction International Corporation which was not able to be transferred. Thus, CSCEC granted the listed company supervising rights.

Corporate structure
The CSCEC has numerous branches or subsidiaries. It is divided into five main divisions and twelve traditional core business areas, including eight Group's engineering offices and four Design Institutes, as well as its own national research laboratory. The main business units of the group are planning and design, project development, equipment leasing, trade, construction and facilities management.

Its subsidiary and listed company, China State Construction Engineering Corporation Limited (CSCECL), was established in 2007. It was listed on the Shanghai Stock Exchange in 2009 with its IPO price at RMB$4.18 per share. The shares closed at RMB$6.53, 56% higher than its IPO price, at the first trading day. It was the world's biggest IPO in 2009, raising the capital of US$7.3 billion.

History
The CSCEC was founded in 1957 as a state company. Early on the country had an international profile building heavy industry and infrastructure in Asia, Africa, and the Middle East.  The predecessor company opened its first overseas office in Kuwait in the late 1970s.  The company broke from its regionally confined work pattern when it entered the U.S. market in 1985, opening an office in Atlanta.  The U.S. subsidiary began by building housing developments with joint venture partners before undertaking its first sole development, Lantana Lakes, a 107-acre, $27 million complex of 42 homes,  in 1987 in Jacksonville, Florida.

In 2009, the company was blacklisted for six years by the World Bank for collusion in the bidding process for the Philippines National Roads Improvement and Management Project.

With the encouragement of the Chinese government and financing assistance from the Export-Import Bank of China, CSCEC has taken increasingly bold steps as a builder and investor of overseas projects.  In 2011, the going abroad trend hit a new high when Baha Mar Resorts, a $3.4 billion casino and resort built and partially owned by CSCEC, opened after "extremely aggressive" efforts by the company to link with the Bahamas developer that started the project.  It was the largest construction project undertaken by a Chinese company outside of China.

The China State Construction Engineering Corporation is also constructing the new Athletics and Football Stadium in Grenada.

In 2020, after the coronavirus outbreak, CSCEC built two hospitals in Wuhan in the span of 10 to 12 days. The 1,000-bed Huoshenshan hospital was finished on February 3, while the 1,600-bed hospital Leishenshan was finished on February 5.

On 28 August 2020, the United States Department of Defense released the names of companies with ties to the People's Liberation Army operating directly or indirectly in the United States. China State Construction Group Co., Ltd. was included on the list. In November 2020, Donald Trump issued an executive order prohibiting any American company or individual from owning shares in companies that the United States Department of Defense has listed as having links to the People's Liberation Army, which included China State Construction Group.

Projects

Participated in constructing Daxing International Airport
Construction of the Great Mosque of Algiers ($1.5 billion)
Realization of the new university town of Constantine ($520 million)
New extension of Algiers airport ($550 million) 
Construction of the proposed new capital of Egypt
Cairo International Conference Center, Egypt
AU Conference Center and Office Complex, Ethiopia
Commercial Bank of Ethiopia Headquarters, Ethiopia
Addis Ababa National Stadium, Ethiopia
Renovation of the Alexander Hamilton Bridge, New York City, New York
 Ventilation shafts for the 7 Subway Extension, New York City, New York
 Sukh Chayn Gardens Housing Estate is a gated community in the suburbs of Lahore, Pakistan.
Federation Tower, Tower A (Ostturm), Moscow: Europe's highest skyscraper 
 Shanghai World Financial Center, Shanghai
 Beijing National Aquatics Centre ( "Water Cube", water cube): the new Chinese national Swimmcenter in Beijing (draft planning in community with the Australian company PTW Architects, the office Ove Arup, and China Construction Design International (CCDI)).
 Shun Hing Square, Shenzhen
 Missile test center of the Shenzhou Space Center (one of the three largest Chinese projects of the eighth five-year plan, won the 1st prize for national scientific and technical progress)
 Airport Passenger Terminal Hong Kong Chek Lap Kok
 One Thousand Museum, Miami, United States
 Leeza SOHO, Beijing, China
 Main administration building of the Bank of China, Hong Kong
 Haier companies building (refrigerator manufacturer), South Carolina, United States
 Nanyang Technological University, Singapore
 National Athletics & Football Stadium, Grenada 
 Enlargement of the Australian Embassy, Beijing
 Embassy of Malaysia, Beijing
 New German Embassy, Beijing
 Sky City, Changsha
 Villa at the Consulate General in China, New York City, United States
 Sheraton Hotel, Pine Club, Algiers, Algeria
 Marriott Hotel, Shanghai
 Kempinski Hotel, Beijing
 Xianyang International Airport, Xi'an
 Baiyun International Airport, Guangzhou
 Taoxian International Airport, Shenyang
 Stadium project Stade des Martyrs, Kinshasa, Zaire
 Cricket Stadium, Barbados
 Kathmandu-Terai expressway Nepal,($1.2 billion)
 Jinnah Stadium, Islamabad, Pakistan
 National Geological Information Center, Botswana
 Underground water reservoir, Mmankgodi (in Gaborone), Botswana
 Gerald Road, Francistown, Botswana
 Binh Thuan Roadway Project SM2/SM3, South Saigon, Vietnam
 Culasi, Antique-Patnaongon Highway, Panay, Philippines
 North irrigation project Jazir, Iraq
 New Hindiya Dam, including railway bridge, the Euphrates, Iraq
 Boukourdane Dam, Algeria
 Mae Kuang Dam, Thailand
 Rama Bridge, Bangkok, Thailand
 21st Century Tower, Shanghai
 Arfa Karim Technology Park, Lahore, Pakistan
 Lakeville Residences, Malaysia
 Burj Qatar, Qatar
 Hilton Dhaka, Bangladesh
 University hospital of Sfax, Tunisia (since 2016).
 M5 Multan-Sukkar Motorways of Pakistan (CPEC)
 Trump International Golf Club, Dubai
Medical project in Cambodia ($73.6 million)
Mixed-use real estate development in Australia ($466.8 million)
A major highway in Argentina ($2.13 billion)
Tesla Giga Shanghai, Shanghai
International Trade Center, Dongguan
Rail Transit Control and Commercial Complex, Dongguan
The Exchange 106 tower in Tun Razak Exchange (TRX), Kuala Lumpur
Goldin Finance 117, Tianjin (on hold)
MET 1 Residences @ KL Metropolis, Kuala Lumpur
Urban Village Phase II Phnom Penh, Cambodia

Subsidiaries
 China Overseas Land and Investment
 China Construction Design International
 China State Construction International Holdings
 China State Construction Engineering Corp. Middle East LLC.
China State Construction Engineering (M) Sdn. Bhd.|China State Construction Engineering (M) Sdn Bhd
 China Construction First Group Corporation Ltd
 China Construction Second Engineering Bureau Ltd
 China Construction third Engineering Bureau Ltd
 China Construction fourth Engineering Division Corp. Ltd
Far East Group

References

External links

China State Construction Engineering Corporation
China State Construction Engineering Corporation Pakistan Branch

Companies in the CSI 100 Index
Companies listed on the Shanghai Stock Exchange
Government-owned companies of China
H shares
Construction and civil engineering companies of China
Companies based in Beijing
Chinese companies established in 1982
Construction and civil engineering companies established in 1982
Chinese companies established in 2007
Construction and civil engineering companies established in 2007